The Tales of Hoffmann is an  by Jacques Offenbach. The French libretto was written by Jules Barbier, based on three short stories by E. T. A. Hoffmann, who is the protagonist of the story. It was Offenbach's final work; he died in October 1880, four months before the premiere.

Composition history and sources 
Offenbach saw a play, written by Barbier and Michel Carré and produced at the Odéon Theatre in Paris in 1851.

After returning from America in 1876, Offenbach learned that Barbier had adapted the play, which  had now set to music at the Opéra. Salomon handed the project to Offenbach. Work proceeded slowly, interrupted by the composition of profitable lighter works. Offenbach had a premonition, like Antonia, the heroine of Act 2, that he would die prior to its completion.

Offenbach continued working on the opera throughout 1880, attending some rehearsals. On 5 October 1880, he died with the manuscript in his hand, just four months before the opening. Shortly before he died, he wrote to Léon Carvalho: ""("Hurry up and stage my opera. I have not much time left, and my only wish is to attend the opening night.")

The stories in the opera include:

 "" ("The Sandman"), 1816.
 "Rath Krespel" ("Councillor Krespel", also known in English as "The Cremona Violin") 1818.
 "" ("The Lost Reflection") from Die Abenteuer der Sylvester-Nacht (The Adventures of New Year's Eve), 1814.

Performance history

The opera was first performed in a public venue at the Opéra-Comique on 10 February 1881, without the third (Venice) act. It was presented in an abridged form at Offenbach's house, 8 Boulevard des Capucines, on 18 May 1879, with Madame Franck-Duvernoy in the soprano roles, Auguez as Hoffmann (baritone) and Émile-Alexandre Taskin in the four villain roles, with Edmond Duvernoy at the piano and a chorus directed by Albert Vizentini. Besides Léon Carvalho, director of the Opéra-Comique, the director of the Ringtheater in Vienna, Franz von Jauner, was also present. Both men requested the rights, but Offenbach granted them to Carvalho.

A four-act version with recitatives was staged at the Ringtheater on 7 December 1881, conducted by Joseph Hellmesberger Jr., although a gas explosion and fire occurred at the theatre after the second performance.

The opera reached its hundredth performance at the Salle Favart on 15 December 1881. The fire at the Opéra-Comique in 1887 destroyed the orchestral parts, and it was not seen again in Paris until 1893, at the Salle de la Renaissance du Théâtre-Lyrique, when it received 20 performances. A new production by Albert Carré (including the Venice act) was mounted at the Opéra-Comique in 1911, with Léon Beyle in the title role and Albert Wolff conducting. This production remained in the repertoire until World War II, receiving 700 performances. Following a recording by Opéra-Comique forces in March 1948, Louis Musy created the first post-war production in Paris, conducted by André Cluytens. The Paris Opera first staged the work in October 1974, directed by Patrice Chéreau with Nicolai Gedda in the title role.

Outside France, the piece was performed in Geneva, Budapest, Hamburg, New York, and Mexico in 1882, Vienna (Theater an der Wien), Prague, and Antwerp in 1883, and Lvov and Berlin in 1884. Local premieres included Buenos Aires in 1894, St Petersburg in 1899, Barcelona in 1905, and London in 1910.

Roles

Synopsis

Prologue

A tavern in Nuremberg: The Muse appears and reveals to the audience her purpose is to draw Hoffmann's attention, and make him abjure all other loves, so he can be devoted to her: poetry. She takes the appearance of Hoffmann's closest friend, Nicklausse. The prima donna Stella, performing Mozart's Don Giovanni, sends a letter to Hoffmann, requesting a meeting in her dressing room after the performance. The letter and the key to the room are intercepted by Councillor Lindorf ("" – In the languid lovers' roles), the first of the opera's incarnations of evil, Hoffmann's nemesis. Lindorf intends to replace Hoffmann at the rendezvous. In the tavern, students wait for Hoffmann. He finally arrives, and entertains them with the legend of Kleinzach the dwarf ("" – Once upon a time at the court of Eisenach). Lindorf coaxes Hoffmann into telling the audience about his three great loves.

Act 1 (Olympia)

This act is based on a portion of "Der Sandmann".

Parlor of a scientist, Paris: Hoffmann's first love is Olympia, an automaton created by the scientist Spalanzani. Hoffmann falls in love with her, not knowing Olympia is a mechanical doll ("" – Come on! Courage and trust... Ah! to live together!). To warn Hoffmann, Nicklausse, possessing the truth about Olympia, sings a story of a mechanical doll with the appearance of a human, but Hoffmann ignores her ("" – A doll with enamel eyes). Coppélius, Olympia's co-creator and this act's incarnation of Nemesis, sells Hoffmann magic glasses to make Olympia appear as a real woman ("" – I have eyes).

Olympia sings one of the opera's most famous arias, "" (The birds in the bower, nicknamed "The Doll Song"), during which she runs-down and needs to be wound-up before she can continue. Hoffmann is tricked into believing his affections are returned, to the bemusement of Nicklausse, subtly attempting to warn his friend ("" – See her under her fan). While dancing with Olympia, Hoffmann falls on the ground and his glasses break. At the same time, Coppélius appears, tearing Olympia apart to retaliate against Spalanzani after cheating him of his fees. With the crowd ridiculing him, Hoffmann realizes he loved an automaton.

Act 2 (Antonia)

This act is based on "".

Crespel's house, Munich: After a long search, Hoffmann finds the house where Crespel and his daughter Antonia are hiding. Hoffmann and Antonia loved each other, but were separated after Crespel decided to hide his daughter from Hoffmann. Antonia inherited her mother's talent for singing, but her father forbids her to sing because of her mysterious illness. Antonia wishes her lover would return to her ("" – "She fled, the dove"). Her father also forbids her to see Hoffmann, who encourages Antonia in her musical career, and therefore, endangers her without knowing it. Crespel tells Frantz, his servant, to stay with his daughter, and after Crespel leaves, Frantz sings a comical song about his talents "" – "Day and night, I quarter my mind."

After Crespel leaves his house, Hoffmann takes advantage of the occasion to sneak in, and the lovers are re-united (love duet: "" – "It's a love song"). After Crespel returns, he receives a visit from Dr Miracle, the act's Nemesis, forcing Crespel to let him heal her. Eavesdropping, Hoffmann learns Antonia may die if she sings too much. He returns to her boudoir, and makes her promise to give up her artistic-dreams. Antonia reluctantly accepts her lover's will. After she is alone, Dr Miracle enters Antonia's boudoir to persuade her to sing and follow her mother's path to glory, stating Hoffmann is sacrificing her to his brutishness, and loves her only for her beauty. With mystic powers, he raises a vision of Antonia's dead mother and induces Antonia to sing, causing her death. Crespel arrives just in time to witness his daughter's last breath. Hoffmann enters, and Crespel wants to kill him, thinking he is responsible for his daughter's death. Nicklausse saves his friend from the old man's vengeance.

Act 3 (Giulietta)

A gallery in a palace, Venice. The act opens with the barcarolle "" – "Beautiful night, oh night of love". Hoffmann falls in love with the courtesan Giulietta, and thinks she returns his affections ("" – "Friends, tender and dreamy love"). Giulietta is not in love with Hoffmann, but seducing him under the orders of Captain Dapertutto, who promises her a diamond if she steals Hoffmann's reflection from a mirror ("" – "Sparkle, diamond"). The jealous Schlemil (cf. Peter Schlemihl for a literary antecedent), a previous victim of Giulietta and Dapertutto (he gave Giulietta his shadow), challenges the poet to a duel, but is killed, thanks to the magic sword Hoffmann was supplied with by Dapertutto. Nicklausse wants to take Hoffmann away from Venice, and goes looking for horses. Meanwhile, Hoffmann meets Giulietta, and cannot resist her ("" – "O God! of what intoxication"): he gives her his reflection, only to be abandoned by the courtesan, to Dapertutto's great pleasure.

Note: In the original version, Hoffmann, furious at being betrayed, tries to stab Giulietta but - blinded by Dapertutto - mistakenly kills his dwarf Pittichinaccio; in Richard Bonynge's version, Giulietta is poisoned and dies, by accidentally drinking the philter Dapertutto prepares for Nicklausse.

Epilogue
The tavern in Nuremberg: Hoffmann, drunk, swears he will never love again, and explains Olympia, Antonia, and Giulietta are three facets of the same person, Stella. They represent, respectively, the young girl's, the musician's, and the courtesan's side of the prima donna. After Hoffmann says he doesn't want to love any more, Nicklausse reveals she is the Muse and reclaims Hoffmann: "Be reborn a poet! I love you, Hoffmann! Be mine!" – "" The magic of poetry reaches Hoffmann as he sings " – "O God! of what intoxication" once more, ending with "Muse, whom I love, I am yours!" – "" At this moment, Stella, tired of waiting for Hoffmann to come to her rendezvous, enters the tavern and finds him drunk. The poet tells her to leave ("Farewell, I will not follow you, phantom, spectre of the past" – ""), and Lindorf, waiting in the shadows, comes forth. Nicklausse explains to Stella that Hoffmann does not love her anymore, but Councillor Lindorf is waiting for her. Some students enter the room for more drinking, while Stella and Lindorf leave together.

Musical numbers 
Prologue

1. Prélude. 
2. Introduction et Couplets: "Glou! Glou!... La vérité, dit-on, sortait d'un puits" (La Muse, Chorus). 
3. Récitatif: "Le conseiller Lindorf, morbleu!" (Lindorf, Andrès).
4. Couplets: "Dans les rôles d'amoureux langoureux" (Lindorf). 
5. Scène et Choeur: "Deux heures devant moi... Drig, drig" (Lindorf, Luther, Nathanaël, Hermann, Wilhelm, Wolfram, Chorus).
6. Scène: "Vrai Dieu! Mes amis" (Hoffmann, Nicklausse, Lindorf, Luther, Nathanaël, Hermann, Wilhelm, Wolfram, Chorus).
7. Chanson: "Il était une fois à la cour d'Eisenach!" (Hoffmann, Lindorf, Luther, Nathanaël, Hermann, Wilhelm, Wolfram, Chorus).
8. Scène: "Peuh! Cette bière est détestable" (Hoffmann, Nicklausse, Lindorf, Luther, Nathanaël, Hermann, Wilhelm, Wolfram, Chorus).
9. Duo et Scène: "Et par où votre Diablerie" (Hoffmann, Nicklausse, Lindorf, Luther, Nathanaël, Hermann, Wilhelm, Wolfram, Chorus).
10. Final: "Je vous dis, moi" (Hoffmann, Nicklausse, Lindorf, Luther, Nathanaël, Hermann, Wilhelm, Wolfram, Chorus).

Act 1: Olympia

11. Entracte. 
12. Récitatif: "Allons! Courage et confiance!" (Hoffmann).
13. Scène et Couplets: "Pardieu! J'étais bien sur" (Nicklausse, Hoffmann).
14. Trio: "C'est moi, Coppélius" (Coppélius, Hoffmann, Nicklausse).
15. Scène: "Non aucun hôte vraiment" (Hoffmann, Nicklausse, Cochenille, Olympia, Spallanzani, Chorus). 
16. Chanson: "Les oiseaux dans la charmille" (Olympia, Chorus).
17. Scène: "Ah! Mon ami! Quel accent!" (Hoffmann, Nicklausse, Cochenille, Olympia, Spallanzani, Chorus).
18. Récitatif et Romance: "Ils se sont éloignés enfin!" (Hoffmann, Olympia). 
19. Duo: "Tu me fuis?" (Hoffmann, Nicklausse, Coppélius).
20. Final: "En place les danseurs" (Hoffmann, Nicklausse, Coppélius, Cochenille, Olympia, Spallanzani, Chorus).

Act 2: Antonia

21. Entracte. 
22. Rêverie: "Elle a fui, la tourterelle" (Antonia).
23. Couplets: "Jour et nuit" (Frantz).
24. Récitatif: "Enfin je vais avoir pourquoi" (Hoffmann, Nicklausse).
25. Air du Violon: "Vois sous l'archet frémissant" (Nicklausse).
26. Scène: "Ah! J'ai le savais bien" (Hoffmann, Antonia). 
27. Duo: "C'est une chanson d'amour" (Hoffmann, Antonia).
28. Quatuor: "Pour conjurer le danger" (Hoffmann, Crespel, Miracle, Antonia). 
29. Trio: "Tu ne chanteras plus?" (Miracle, Antonia, Le Fantôme)
30. Final: "Mon enfant, ma fille! Antonia!" (Crespel, Antonia, Hoffmann, Nicklausse, Miracle).

Act 3: Giulietta

31. Entracte. 
32. Barcarolle: "Messieurs, silence!... Belle nuit, ô nuit d'amour" (Hoffmann, Nicklausse, Giulietta, Chorus).
33. Chant Bacchique: "Et moi, ce n'est pas là, pardieu!... Amis, l'amour tendre et rêveur" (Hoffmann, Nicklausse).
34. Mélodrame (Musique-de-scène). 
35. Chanson du Diamant: "Tourne, tourne, miroir" (Dappertutto). 
36. Mélodrame (Musique-de-scène).
37. Scène de Jeu: "Giulietta, palsambleu!" (Hoffmann, Nicklausse, Dappertutto, Pittichinaccio, Giulietta, Schlémil, Chorus).
38. Récitatif et Romance: "Ton ami dit vrai!... Ô Dieu, de quelle ivresse" (Hoffmann, Giulietta).
39. Duo de Reflet: "Jusque-là cependant" (Hoffmann, Giulietta). 
40. Final: "Ah! Tu m'as défiée" (Hoffmann, Nicklausse, Dappertutto, Pittichinaccio, Giulietta, le capitaine des sbires, Chorus).

Epilogue: Stella

41. Entracte. 
42. Chœur: "Folie! Oublie tes douleurs!" (Luther, Nathanaël, Hermann, Wilhelm, Wolfram, Chorus). 
43. Chœur: "Glou! Glou! Glou!" (Hoffmann, Nicklausse, Lindorf, Luther, Nathanaël, Hermann, Wilhelm, Wolfram, Chorus).
44. Couplet: "Pour le cœur de Phrygné" (Hoffmann, Chorus)
45. Apothéose: "Des cendres de ton cœur" (Hoffmann, La Muse, Lindorf, Andrès, Stella, Luther, Nathanaël, Hermann, Wilhelm, Wolfram, Chorus).

The aria "" (Song of little Zaches) in the prologue is based on the short story "" ("Little Zaches, called cinnabar"), 1819. The barcarolle, "Belle nuit, ô nuit d'amour" in the Venetian act, is the opera's famous number, borrowed by Offenbach from his earlier opera Rheinnixen (French: Les fées du Rhin).

Editions

Offenbach did not live to see his opera performed. He died on 5 October 1880, four months before its premiere, but after completing the piano score and orchestrating the prologue and first act. As a result, different editions of the opera emerged, some bearing little resemblance to the authentic work. The version performed at the opera's premiere was by Ernest Guiraud, after completing Offenbach's scoring and recitatives. Over the decades, new editions continue to appear, although the emphasis, particularly since the 1970s, shifted to authenticity. In this regard, a milestone was the Michael Kaye edition of 1992 (first performed on stage at the L.A Opera in 1988), but, then, additional authentic music was found, and published in 1999. In 2011, two competing publishing houses – one French, one German – released a joint edition reflecting and reconciling the research of recent decades. Here are some of the edition "variables" circulating since Offenbach died:

 Addition of extra music not intended by Offenbach for the opera
Commonly, directors choose among two numbers in the Giulietta act:
"", based on a tune from the overture to Offenbach's operetta A Journey to the Moon and included by André Bloch for a Monaco production in 1908.
The Sextet (sometimes called Septet, counting the chorus as a character) of unknown origin, but containing elements of the barcarolle.
 Changes to the sequence of the acts
The three acts, telling different stories from the life of Hoffmann, are independent (with the exception of a mention of Olympia in the Antonia act), easily swapped without affecting the story. Offenbach's order was Prologue–Olympia–Antonia–Giulietta–Epilogue, but during the 20th century, the work was usually performed with Giulietta's act preceding Antonia's. Recently, the original order was restored, but the practice is not universal. The general reason for the switch is that the Antonia act is more musically accomplished.

 Naming of the acts
The designation of the acts is disputed. The German scholar , among others, favours numbering the Prologue as Act One, and the Epilogue as Act Five, with Olympia as Act Two, Antonia as Act Three, and Giulietta as Act Four.
 Changes to the story 
The opera was sometimes performed (for example, during the premiere at the Opéra-Comique) without the entire Giulietta act, although the famous barcarolle from that act was inserted into the Antonia act, and Hoffmann's aria "Ô Dieu, de quelle ivresse" was inserted into the epilogue. In 1881, before the opera was performed in Vienna, the Giulietta act was restored, but modified so the courtesan does not die at the end by accidental poisoning, but exits in a gondola accompanied by her servant Pitichinaccio.
 Spoken dialogue or recitative
Due to its opéra-comique genre, the original score contained much dialogue, sometimes replaced by recitative, and this lengthened the opera so much, some acts were removed (see above).
 The number of singers performing
Offenbach intended the four soprano roles be played by the same singer, for Olympia, Giulietta, and Antonia are three facets of Stella, Hoffmann's unreachable love. Similarly, the four villains (Lindorf, Coppélius, Miracle, and Dapertutto) would be performed by the same bass-baritone, because they are all manifestations of evil. While the doubling of the four villains is quite common, most performances of the work use different singers for the loves of Hoffmann because different skills are needed for each role: Olympia requires a skilled-coloratura singer with stratospheric-high notes, Antonia is written for a lyrical voice, and Giulietta is usually performed by a dramatic soprano or a mezzo-soprano. Any performance with all three roles (four if the role of Stella is counted) performed by a single soprano in a performance is considered one of the largest challenges in the lyric coloratura repertoire. Notable sopranos performing all three roles include Karan Armstrong, Vina Bovy, Patrizia Ciofi, Edita Gruberová, Fanny Heldy, Catherine Malfitano, Anja Silja, Beverly Sills, Sonya Yoncheva, Luciana Serra, Ruth Ann Swenson, Carol Vaness, Faith Esham, Ninon Vallin and Virginia Zeani. All four roles were performed by Josephine Barstow, Sumi Jo, Mireille Delunsch, Diana Damrau, Julia Migenes, Elizabeth Futral, Marlis Petersen, Anna Moffo, Georgia Jarman, Elena Moșuc, Joan Sutherland, Melitta Muszely, Olga Peretyatko, Patricia Petibon, Pretty Yende, Jessica Pratt and Nicole Chevalier.

A recent version including the authentic music by Offenbach was reconstructed by the French Offenbach scholar Jean-Christophe Keck. A successful performance of this version was produced at the Lausanne Opera (Switzerland). Another recent edition by Michael Kaye was performed at the Opéra National de Lyon in 2013 with Patrizia Ciofi singing the roles of Olympia, Antonia, and Giulietta ; and at Hamburg State Opera with Elena Moșuc singing the roles of Olympia, Antonia, Giulietta, and Stella in the 2007 production.

In early 2016, Jean-Christophe Keck announced he traced and identified the full manuscript of the Prologue and the Olympia act, with vocal lines by Offenbach and instrumentation by Guiraud. The Antonia act and epilogue are in the BnF, while the Giulietta act is in the Offenbach-family archives.

Recordings

The opera is frequently recorded. Well-regarded recordings include:
a 1964–65 recording conducted by André Cluytens with the Paris Conservatoire Orchestra and Nicolai Gedda
a 1971 recording by Richard Bonynge with the Orchestre de la Suisse Romande, Plácido Domingo, Joan Sutherland, Huguette Tourangeau and Gabriel Bacquier
a 1972 recording by Julius Rudel with the London Symphony Orchestra, Stuart Burrows, Beverly Sills, Norman Treigle, and Susanne Marsee.
a 1988 recording by Sylvain Cambreling, Brussels Opéra National du Théâtre Royal de la Monnaie; EMI, Cat: 358613–2, studio recording based on the Oeser version
a 1986 recording by Seiji Ozawa, French National Orchestra, ; Deutsche Grammophon label Cat: 427682; with Plácido Domingo and Edita Gruberová
a 1996 studio recording by Kent Nagano, Chorus and Orchestra of the Opéra National de Lyon and Roberto Alagna as Hoffmann; Erato, Cat: 0630-14330-2. This recording is based on the Kaye-Keck version of the opera.

Film
Hoffmanns Erzählungen (1916), a silent German film adaptation directed by Richard Oswald
The Tales of Hoffmann (1923), an Austrian silent film directed by and starring Max Neufeld
The Tales of Hoffmann (1951), a British film adaptation written, produced, and directed by Michael Powell and Emeric Pressburger
 (1970), a German film adaptation directed by Walter Felsenstein and Georg F. Mielke

References

External links

 
 : libretto of a modified version (as first performed in the USA) in French and English
Analysis of The Tales of Hoffman in The Ultimate Art, Chap. 13: "The Odd Couple: Offenbach and Hoffmann"
 
 Reviews of current and past productions of The Tales of Hoffmann since 2007 (mainly in German)

Operas based on works by E. T. A. Hoffmann
Operas by Jacques Offenbach
French-language operas
Libretti by Jules Barbier
Libretti by Michel Carré
1881 operas
Unfinished operas
Operas completed by others
Operas
Opera world premieres at the Opéra-Comique
Operas based on literature
Operas adapted into films
Works based on The Sandman (short story)